The Lion King: Original Motion Picture Soundtrack is the soundtrack album for the 1994 Disney animated film, The Lion King. It contains songs from the film written by Elton John and Tim Rice, and a score composed by Hans Zimmer. Elton John has a dual role of performer for several tracks. Additional performers include Lebo M, Carmen Twillie, Jason Weaver, Rowan Atkinson, Joseph Williams, Whoopi Goldberg, Jeremy Irons, Cheech Marin, Jim Cummings, Nathan Lane, Ernie Sabella, and Sally Dworsky. The album was released on May 31, 1994, on CD and audio cassette. The soundtrack was recorded in three different countries: the U.S., the U.K. and South Africa.  It is the best-selling soundtrack album to an animated film in the United States with over 7 million copies sold, with 4,934,000 copies sold in 1994.

An expanded version of The Lion King soundtrack, featuring 30 minutes of previously unreleased material, was released as part of the Walt Disney Records: The Legacy Collection series on June 24, 2014. In 2014, Hot Topic released a vinyl picture disc of the soundtrack.

In 2010, Rhapsody called it one of the all-time great Disney and Pixar Soundtracks.

Track listing

All songs are composed by Elton John with lyrics by Tim Rice. All scores are composed by Hans Zimmer.

The Legacy Collection release

Walt Disney Records released an expanded edition of The Lion King soundtrack containing an additional thirty minutes of previously unreleased material from the film, as well as a collection of demo versions of cues. This revision contains a new remastered mix by Alan Meyerson.

Commercial performance
The soundtrack shipped over 18 million copies in the U.S. and eventually went 10× platinum in 1995, thus becoming the biggest-selling soundtrack ever from an animated film. Its certification was promoted to Diamond when the award was instituted in 1999. According to Nielsen Soundscan the soundtrack, as of April 2014, has sold a total of 7.873 million copies in the US.  It is also the best-selling vinyl album in the Nielsen SoundScan era (starting 1991), with 1,043,000 copies sold as of June 2014.

Accolades

Charts

Weekly charts

Year-end charts

Decade-end charts

Certifications and sales

|-
! colspan="3" | Original album release
|-

|-
! colspan="3" | Original cast recording
|-

|-
! colspan="3" | Sing-Along shortform
|-

|-
! colspan="3" | Hans Zimmer Re-release
|-

See also
 List of best-selling albums in the United States
 Return to Pride Rock: Songs Inspired by Disney's The Lion King II: Simba's Pride
 The Lion King (2019 soundtrack)

References

External links

1994 soundtrack albums
1990s film soundtrack albums
Albums produced by Chris Thomas (record producer)
Albums produced by Jay Rifkin
Albums produced by Mark Mancina
Disney animation soundtracks
Elton John soundtracks
Grammy Award for Best Musical Album for Children
Hans Zimmer soundtracks
Soundtrack
Disney Renaissance soundtracks
Walt Disney Records soundtracks
Tim Rice albums
Albums recorded at United Western Recorders
Musical film soundtracks
Scores that won the Best Original Score Academy Award